The Musical Pig is a 1966 animated short by Zlatko Grgić about an unlucky little pig with a gift for singing. Grgić was assisted by Borivoj Dovniković during the writing of the script.

Synopsis
"A pig with a magnificent voice who wants to be listened to and appreciated. He goes to one person after another, but their ears are deaf, they see him as roast pork, utter a hunting cry and seize a knife".

Accolades
The short competed for the Short Film Award at the 1966 Cannes Film Festival.

References

External links

1966 animated films
1966 films
Croatian animated short films
Yugoslav animated short films
Zagreb Film films